Elections to Newtownabbey Borough Council were held on 19 May 1993 on the same day as the other Northern Irish local government elections. The election used four district electoral areas to elect a total of 25 councillors.

Election results

Note: "Votes" are the first preference votes.

Districts summary

|- class="unsortable" align="centre"
!rowspan=2 align="left"|Ward
! % 
!Cllrs
! % 
!Cllrs
! %
!Cllrs
! %
!Cllrs
! % 
!Cllrs
!rowspan=2|TotalCllrs
|- class="unsortable" align="center"
!colspan=2 bgcolor="" | UUP
!colspan=2 bgcolor="" | DUP
!colspan=2 bgcolor="" | Alliance
!colspan=2 bgcolor="" | SDLP
!colspan=2 bgcolor="white"| Others
|-
|align="left"|Antrim Line
|bgcolor="#40BFF5"|24.1
|bgcolor="#40BFF5"|2
|21.0
|1
|18.3
|2
|17.8
|1
|18.8
|1
|7
|-
|align="left"|Ballyclare
|bgcolor="#40BFF5"|42.2
|bgcolor="#40BFF5"|3
|23.1
|1
|12.2
|0
|0.0
|0
|22.5
|1
|5
|-
|align="left"|Macedon
|28.7
|2
|20.3
|1
|13.8
|1
|0.0
|0
|bgcolor="#DDDDDD"|37.2
|bgcolor="#DDDDDD"|2
|6
|-
|align="left"|University
|bgcolor="#40BFF5"|39.0
|bgcolor="#40BFF5"|3
|21.4
|2
|18.0
|1
|0.0
|0
|21.6
|1
|7
|-
|- class="unsortable" class="sortbottom" style="background:#C9C9C9"
|align="left"| Total
|32.5
|10
|21.3
|5
|16.1
|4
|5.5
|1
|24.6
|5
|25
|-
|}

Districts results

Antrim Line

1993: 2 x UUP, 2 x Alliance, 1 x DUP, 1 x SDLP, 1 x Independent Unionist

Ballyclare

1993: 3 x UUP, 1 x DUP, 1 x Independent Unionist

Macedon

1993: 2 x UUP, 1 x DUP, 1 x Alliance, 1 x Newtownabbey Labour, 1 x Independent Unionist

University

1993: 3 x UUP, 2 x DUP, 1 x Alliance, 1 x Independent Unionist

References

Newtownabbey Borough Council elections
Newtownabbey